Cussy-en-Morvan ( "Cussy-in-Morvan"), commonly referred to simply as Cussy, is a rural commune in the Saône-et-Loire department in the Bourgogne-Franche-Comté region in central-east France. As of 2019, Cussy-en-Morvan had a population of 378.

It is situated on the departmental border with both Nièvre and Côte-d'Or at Gien-sur-Cure and the Ménessaire exclave, respectively.

See also
Communes of the Saône-et-Loire department
Morvan Regional Natural Park

References

Communes of Saône-et-Loire